New Zealand and the United States clashed for the first time at the inaugural 1991 Rugby World Cup in Wales; the Eagles handed the Black Ferns their first defeat in the semi-final with a score of 7–0. They also faced each other in three separate World Cups — 1998, 2014 and 2017. At the 2014 World Cup they met twice, in the pool stages and in the fifth place playoff.

The Eagles hosted the Black Ferns for the first time at Soldier Field in Chicago, it was part of a Rugby Weekend triple header. The United States were trounced 67–6 by the Black Ferns. Their most recent encounter was at the 2022 Pacific Four Series in New Zealand. The Black Ferns clinched their first series title after beating the Eagles 50–6 in the final match.

Summary

Results

References

External links 

 Results Summary at stats.allblacks.com

United States women's national rugby union team
New Zealand women's national rugby union team